Jalan Lombong (Johor state route J171) is a major road in Johor, Malaysia. It is also a main route to Kota Tinggi Waterfalls.

List of junctions

Roads in Johor